Christopher Steven Wimmer (born September 25, 1970) is an American professional baseball player and scout.

Wimmer attended Wichita State University, where he played college baseball for the Wichita State Shockers. He was a two-time All-American, and led the NCAA in hits during the 1991 season. Wimmer played for the United States national baseball team in the 1992 Summer Olympics.

The San Francisco Giants selected Wimmer in the eighth round of the 1992 MLB draft. In January 1996, the Giants traded him to the St. Louis Cardinals as the player to be named later in the December 1995 trade that sent Royce Clayton to the Cardinals for Doug Creek, Rich DeLucia, and Allen Watson. After he retired, Wimmer became a scout for the Detroit Tigers.

References

External links

1970 births
Living people
Baseball players from Wichita, Kansas
Baseball infielders
Baseball players at the 1992 Summer Olympics
Olympic baseball players of the United States
Pan American Games medalists in baseball
Pan American Games bronze medalists for the United States
Baseball players at the 1991 Pan American Games
Medalists at the 1991 Pan American Games
Altoona Curve players
Carolina Mudcats players
Louisville Redbirds players
Nashville Sounds players
Orlando Rays players
Phoenix Firebirds players
San Jose Giants players
Shreveport Captains players
Wichita State Shockers baseball players